The Audacious-class ironclad battleships were designed by Sir Edward Reed at the request of the Board of Admiralty to serve as second-class battleships on distant foreign stations.

Background and design

The principal motivation driving the Admiralty was the French policy, already well advanced, of dispatching their own small ironclads to these same distant stations.  was under construction, and  had been authorised. Both of these were turret-armed ships, and the press agitated for a turret-mounted armament in these newly ordered ships. The Admiralty, however, decided that as there had been built a long succession of successful broadside ironclads, and no turret-armed ships had been produced other than some coastal defence ships of low displacement and limited range, it would be better to await the assessment of Monarch and Captain before departing from the broadside principle.

As the ships were intended for service in waters far distant from Britain, and given the limited efficiency of the steam engines of the period, it was necessary to equip them with a full sailing rig. Reed never wavered from his belief that in a fully rigged ship armament carried in a central broadside battery was the superior method, being unobstructed by masts and rigging. Both the designer and the Admiralty were therefore in total agreement that these ships should not be armed with turret-mounted artillery. The rig was later converted to a barque-rig, which required fewer hands to manage.

Reed found that, on the dimensions of the older ship, the armament, armour and machinery would all be insufficient for the stated requirements, and asked for an increase in tonnage, which was reluctantly granted by the Board.

The Admiralty, following a commitment made to Parliament by the First Lord of the Admiralty, put the other two ships out to tender. Submissions of various designs were received: a broadside and turret ship from Mare & Company, a broadside ship from Palmers, a different broadside ship from Thames Ironworks, and turret ships from Napiers, Samudas and Lairds Co & Sons. All were determined to be in some way inadequate, and ultimately the third and fourth ships were built, with some delay, to the Admiralty design.

Ships
  : Launched 27 February 1869. Renamed HMS Fisgard in 1902 and reclassified as a Depot ship. Renamed HMS Imperieuse in 1914 and reclassified as a Repair ship. Sold for breaking up 12 March 1927.
  : Launched 29 May 1869. Reclassified as a Depot ship in 1901. Renamed HMS Erebus in 1904. Renamed HMS Fisgard II and reclassified as a Training ship in 1906. Sank while under tow on 17 September 1914.
  : Launched 1 March 1870. Put into Reserve 1890, converted to coal hulk 1900. Sold for scrap 15 May 1906.
  : Launched 3 January 1870. Sunk after accidental collision with Iron Duke on 1 September 1875.

References

Bibliography

External links

 
Battleship classes
Ship classes of the Royal Navy
Audacious class battleship